Punt or punting may refer to:

Boats
Punt (boat), a flat-bottomed boat with a square-cut bow developed on the River Thames
Falmouth Quay Punt, a small sailing vessel hired by ships anchored in Falmouth harbour
Norfolk Punt, a type of racing dinghy developed in Norfolk
Cable ferry, known as a punt in Australian English

Places
 Land of Punt, a trading partner of Ancient Egypt, considered by many scholars to be in the Horn of Africa
 Puntland, a region in north-eastern Somalia, centered on Garowe in the Nugaal province

Sports and recreation
 Punt (gridiron football), a way of kicking a ball in the American or Canadian varieties of football
 Punt (Australian football), a way of kicking a ball in the Australian variety of football
 A type of goal kick in association football

Other uses
 Punt (surname), a surname
 Punt, Punt Éireannach or Irish pound, pre-euro currency
 El Punt, a Catalan newspaper
 Punt gun, a type of extremely large shotgun, mounted directly on punt boats
 A punt or punty, a tool used in glassblowing
 A punt mark or pontil mark, left by the glassblowing tool
 Punt (wine bottle), the indented bottom of a wine bottle
 Punt, a colloquial term in British English for bet or wager in gambling
 PUNT, the Spanish acronym of the United National Workers' Party, a former political party in Equatorial Guinea

See also
 Punter (disambiguation)
 Pundt